Mohammad Jalil Rasouli (born 1947 in Hamedan) is a notable Iranian artist and Persian calligrapher.

He is one of the pioneering figures in modernist movement of Persian calligraphy.

See also
Persian art

External links
Some of Jalil Rasouli's works 

Iranian artists
Iranian calligraphers
People from Hamadan
1947 births
Living people
Date of birth missing (living people)